Greenville (locally ) is a city in and the seat of Greenville County, South Carolina, United States. With a population of 70,720 at the 2020 census, it is the sixth-largest city in the state. Greenville is located approximately halfway between Atlanta, Georgia, and Charlotte, North Carolina, along Interstate 85. Its metropolitan area also includes Interstates 185 and 385. Greenville is the anchor city of the Upstate, a combined statistical area with a population of 1,487,610 at the 2020 census. Greenville was the fourth fastest-growing city in the United States between 2015 and 2016, according to the U.S. Census Bureau.

Greenville is the center of the Upstate region of South Carolina, creating one of the largest urban centers in the Deep South. Numerous large companies are located within the city, such as Michelin, Prisma Health, Bon Secours, and Duke Energy. Greenville County Schools is another large employer and is the largest school district in South Carolina. Having seen rapid development over the past two decades, Greenville has also received many accolades and awards. Some of these include "The South’s Most 'Tasteful' Small Towns" from Forbes in 2020, "15 of the Most Underrated Travel Destinations of the Year, So Far" from Insider in 2019, "Best Places to Live" from Money in 2019, and "Best Place to Live in the USA #22" from U.S. News & World Report in 2019. The city continues to expand rapidly into the 2020s as is evident from rapid population, economic, and developmental growth.

History

From Cherokee Land to Greenville County

The land of present-day Greenville was once the hunting ground of the Cherokee, which was forbidden to colonists. A wealthy settler from Virginia named Richard Pearis arrived in South Carolina around 1754 and established relations with the Cherokee. Pearis established a plantation on the Reedy River called the Great Plains in present-day downtown Greenville. The American Revolution divided the South Carolina country between the Loyalists and Patriots. Pearis supported the Loyalists and together with their allies, the Cherokee, attacked the Patriots. The Patriots retaliated by burning down Pearis' plantation and jailing him in Charleston. Pearis never returned to his plantation but Paris Mountain is named after him. The Treaty of Dewitt's Corner in 1777 ceded almost all Cherokee land, including present-day Greenville, to South Carolina.

Greenville County was created in 1786.  Some sources state it was named for its physical appearance, while others say the county is named after General Nathanael Greene in honor of his service in the American Revolutionary War, or after early settler Isaac Green. Lemuel J. Alston came to Greenville County in 1788 and bought  and a portion of Pearis' former plantation. In 1797 Alston used his land holdings to establish a village called Pleasantburg where he also built a stately mansion. In 1816, Alston's land was purchased by Vardry McBee, who then leased the Alston mansion for a summer resort, before making the mansion his home from 1835 until his death in 1864. Pleasantburg was renamed as Greenville in 1821 and became a village in 1831. Considered to be the father of Greenville, McBee donated land for many structures such as churches, academies, and a cotton mill. Furman University was funded by McBee who helped bring the university to Greenville from Winnsboro, South Carolina in 1851. In 1853 McBee and other Greenville County leaders funded a new railroad called the Greenville and Columbia Railroad. Greenville boomed to around 1,000 in the 1850s due to the growth of McBee's donations and the attraction of the town as a summer resort for visitors.

Latter 19th century

In December 1860 Greenville supported a convention to debate the issue of secession for South Carolina. The Greenville District sent James Furman, William K. Easley, Perry E. Duncan, William H. Campbell, and James P. Harrison as delegates for the convention. On December 20, 1860, the South Carolina state convention, along with the Greenville delegation, voted to secede from the Union. Greenville County provided over 2,000 soldiers to the Confederate States Army. The town supplied food, clothing, and firearms to the Confederacy. Greenville saw no action from the war until 1865 when Union troops came through the town looking for President Jefferson Davis of the Confederacy who had fled south from Richmond, Virginia. In June 1865 Andrew Johnson appointed Greenville County native Benjamin Franklin Perry as Governor of South Carolina.

In February 1869, Greenville's town charter was amended by the S. C. General Assembly establishing Greenville, the town, as a city. Construction boomed in the 1870s such as the establishment of a bridge over the Reedy River, new mills on the river and new railroads. The Greenville News was established in 1874 as Greenville's first daily newspaper. Southern Bell installed the first telephone lines in the city. The most important infrastructure that came to the city were cotton mills. Prominent cotton mill businesses operated near Greenville making it a cotton mill town. By 1915 Greenville became known as the "Textile Center of the South." From 1915 to 2004, the city hosted an important textile manufacturing trade fair, the Southern Textile Exposition.

20th century

During World War I, Greenville served as a training camp center for Army recruits. After World War I commercial activity expanded with new movie theaters and department stores. The Mansion House was demolished and replaced with the Poinsett Hotel in 1925. The Great Depression hurt the economy of Greenville forcing mills to lay off workers. Furman University and the Greenville Women's College also struggled in the crippling economy forcing them to merge in 1933. The Textile Workers Strike of 1934 caused such an uproar in the city and surrounding mill towns that the National Guard had to subdue the chaos. The New Deal established Sirrine Stadium and a new Greenville High School. The Greenville Army Air Base was established in 1942 during World War II contributing to the further growth of Greenville.

Following the war, a November 19, 1946, propane explosion left 6 dead and over 150 injured.

On February 16, 1947, Willie Earle, a black man accused of stabbing a cab driver, was taken from his jail cell by a mob of mostly taxi drivers and murdered. Thirty-one white men were jointly tried for the crime; most of the accused signed confessions, many of them naming Roosevelt Carlos Hurd as the lynch mob leader and the person who ultimately killed Earle with the shotgun. On May 21, 1947, a jury of 12 white men returned verdicts of not guilty for every defendant.

After World War II, Greenville's economy surged with the establishment of new downtown stores and the expansion of the city limits. Furman University doubled its student population and moved to a new location. Higher education facilities such as Bob Jones University in 1947 and Greenville Technical College in 1962 were established in Greenville. The Greenville–Spartanburg International Airport was established in nearby Greer in 1962. The economy of Greenville finally waned in the 1970s leaving a void in downtown Greenville due to the flight of many retailers. Mayor Max Heller then revitalized downtown Greenville with the Greenville County Museum of Art and the Hughes Main Library. Main Street was then converted into a two-lane road lined with trees and sidewalks. With a 1978 federal grant, a convention center and hotel were built, bringing business back to the area.

Geography

Greenville is located at  (34.844313, −82.385428), roughly equidistant between Atlanta ( southwest), and Charlotte, North Carolina ( northeast).

Greenville is in the foothills of the Blue Ridge Mountains, a physiographic province of the larger Appalachian Mountains range, and includes many small hills. The Reedy River, a tributary of the Saluda River, runs through the center of the city.

Greenville is located in the Brevard Fault Zone and has had occasional minor earthquakes.

Climate
Greenville, like much of the Piedmont region of the southeastern United States, has a mild version of a humid subtropical climate (Köppen Cfa), with four distinct seasons; the city is part of USDA Hardiness zone 7b/8a. On average, there are 59 nights per year that drop to or below freezing, and only 1.3 days that fail to rise above freezing.

There are an average 43 days per year with highs at or above . The average window for freezing temperatures is November 4 thru April 1, allowing a growing season of 217 days.

These storms can have a major impact on the area, as they often pull tree limbs down on power lines and make driving hazardous.

Law and government

The city of Greenville adopted the Council-Manager form of municipal government in 1976. The Greenville City Council consists of the mayor and six council members. The mayor and two council members are elected at-large while the remaining council members are chosen from single-member districts. Greenville Municipal Court handles criminal misdemeanor violations, traffic violations, and city ordinance violations. As of 2021, the city's mayor is Knox H. White, who has been in that position since December 1995.

The Greenville Police Department was established in 1845 as the Greenville Police Force. By 1876 the Greenville Police Force became the Greenville Police Department. In 1976 the Greenville Police Department moved into the Greenville County Law Enforcement Center with the Greenville County Sheriff's Department. The Greenville Police Department serves Greenville with around 241 employees with 199 sworn officers.

Districts 22–25 of the South Carolina House of Representatives cover portions of Greenville, as do state senate districts 6–8. The city is within South Carolina's 4th congressional district, represented by William Timmons since 2019.

Attractions
As the largest city in the Upstate, Greenville offers many activities and attractions. Greenville's theaters and event venues regularly host major concerts and touring theater companies. Four independent theaters present several plays a year.

Event venues

 Bon Secours Wellness Arena, the home of the Greenville Swamp Rabbits of the ECHL, is a 16,000-seat arena in downtown Greenville that opened in 1998 as the Bi-Lo Center.
 Peace Center, a performing arts center that includes a concert hall with 2,100 seats and a theater seating 400, and a 1,200-seat amphitheater.
 Fluor Field at the West End, home of the Greenville Drive baseball team, the Class-A affiliate of the Boston Red Sox.
 Greenville Convention Center, a  convention and meeting facility that was established in 1964 as the newest of a series of Textile Halls, the original dating back to 1915 as the Southern Textile Exposition.

Landmarks

 Falls Park on the Reedy, a large regional park in the West End with gardens and several waterfalls, with access to the Swamp Rabbit Trail. Dedicated in 2004, the $15.0 million park is home to the Liberty Bridge, a pedestrian suspension bridge overlooking the Reedy River. The park's development sparked a $75 million public-private development, Riverplace, directly across Main Street. Falls Park has been called the birthplace of Greenville, but in the mid-20th century the area was in severe decline, and the Camperdown Bridge had been built across the Falls, obstructing view. In the mid-1980s, the City adopted a master plan for the park, leading to the removal of the Camperdown Bridge and making way for extensive renovations, to include  of gardens and the Liberty Bridge. While bridges with similar structural concepts have been built in Europe, the Liberty Bridge is unique in its geometry.
 Greenville County Museum of Art specializing in American art, frequently with a Southern perspective that dates back to the 18th century. It is noted for its collections of work by Andrew Wyeth and Jasper Johns, as well as a contemporary collection that features such notables as Andy Warhol, Georgia O'Keeffe, and others.
 Roper Mountain Science Center is home to a historic 23" refractor telescope, eighth largest of its kind in the United States.
 Greenville Zoo was established in 1960 and is located in Cleveland Park.
 McPherson Park is the city's oldest park and has a free public miniature golf course
 Upcountry History, walk through three centuries of Upcountry South Carolina history and experience the stories of people who shaped this region through state-of-the art interactive multi-media exhibits and dynamic programming for all ages.
 The Children's Museum of the Upstate is one of the nation's largest children's museums and one of the first to become Smithsonian affiliated, TCMU provides an experience like no other for play-based learning and hands-on engagement for all families.
 Linky Stone Park: The Children's Garden is a 1.7-acre horticultural attraction featuring a unique garden that allows visitors to experience flowers using all five senses, a geology wall made of rocks and minerals from around the Upstate, a textile garden, a Hansel and Gretel cottage, and a secret garden.
 Runway Park at GMU, watch aircraft take off and land while enjoying this free park with an educational amphitheater, exercise "Perimeter Taxiway", walking "Runways", aviation themed playground, a swing set, a Bi-plane "Climber", a picnic hangar and a Cessna 310 display. A 15-foot cross section of a Boeing 737 fuselage will be a handicapped accessible park entrance.
 Swamp Rabbit Trail, 22 mile greenway connecting downtown greenville to the City of Travelers Rest
 Cancer Survivors Park, A space for celebration, learning, healing, and hope, this new-to-Greenville park is a place of reflection to honor those who have battled or continue to battle cancer.
 Shoeless Joe Jackson Museum & Baseball Library, located in the historic home of baseball legend Shoeless Joe Jackson adjacent to Fluor Field at the West End

Festivals
 Euphoria Greenville is an annual four-day culinary mid-September event held in the Wyche Pavilion at Larkin's on the River, Art in the Park, and the Peace Center for the Performing Arts; the food, wine, and music festival in 2019 included an educational component and dinners by Michelin-starred chefs.
 Fall for Greenville is a three-day music and food street festival held each fall. The 2019 festival was the 37th, with hundreds of food items and tens of musical artists across six stages.
 Artisphere is a three-day art festival held each spring. The 2019 festival featured musicians The New Respects and Jill Andrews and over a hundred visual artists and street performers.
 iMAGINE Upstate is a weekend celebration and showcase of STEM, entrepreneurial, creative, and innovative activity in the Upstate held each spring. The festival promotes learning as fun, through various hands-on activities, interactive shows, and experiences.
 SC Comicon is a two-day comic book convention held annually. The event draws thousands of attendees, many of whom dress in cosplay.
 Indie Craft Parade is a festival of handmade art held each September. 2019 hosted the 10th annual event, which has over 100 artists, local food, and a free photo booth.
 The Upstate Shakespeare Festival performs Shakespeare and other classic plays each summer in Falls Park. The 25th festival was held in 2019 and featured The Tempest, performed by The Warehouse Theatre.
 The Greek Festival is a three-day festival sponsored by the Greek Orthodox Church in downtown Greenville to celebrate Greek culture. 2019's 33rd annual festival of dance, music, and food included tours of St. George Greek Orthodox Cathedral.
 New South Comedy Festival is a ten-day comedy festival featuring improvisational, stand-up, sketch, and musical comedy from around the country. 2018's 5th annual festival featured over 300 comedians.
 Greenville Open Studios, established in 2002, is an annual three-day local arts celebration in which 158 local artists open their studios to the public.  The 2019 festival was the 18th, with record-setting attendance.
 First Fridays Gallery Crawl features more than 30 art galleries and venues opening to the public with free admission. Hosted by the Metropolitan Arts Council, it occurs the first Friday of every month from 6 p.m. to 9 p.m.

Education

Public schools
The Greenville County School District is the largest school district in the state of South Carolina and ranked the 44th largest district in the United States, with 19 high schools, 24 middle schools, and 52 elementary schools in the district. The district's 2018–2023 strategic plan noted it had 10,000 employees, including 6,000 teachers with an average of 12.8 years of experience. In addition to traditional public schools, Greenville's downtown area is home to the South Carolina Governor's School for the Arts & Humanities, a boarding school for young artists.

Private schools
In addition to public schools, Greenville County has a number of private and religious schools, including St Mary's Catholic School (founded in 1900), Camperdown Academy (for students with learning disabilities), Hidden Treasure Christian School (a school for students with physical and/or mental disabilities), Christ Church Episcopal School (a college-preparatory Episcopalian school with an American school outside of Germany certified by the Bavarian Ministry of Education), Shannon Forest Christian School (an evangelical Christian school), Saint Joseph's Catholic School, Our Lady of the Rosary Catholic School, St. Anthony's Catholic School, Southside Christian School (established in 1967 by Southside Baptist Church), Hampton Park Christian School, Bob Jones Academy and Elementary School, Carolina Film Institute (a film school founded in 2008), Green Charter (originally one of the Gülen movement schools), and Greenville Classical Academy (a classical Christian school established in 2004).

Charter schools 
Greenville has numerous public charter schools that are free to state residents.

Colleges and universities

Greenville has several colleges and universities located within the city limits, Bob Jones University, and Greenville Technical College. Additionally Furman University and North Greenville University are located in the greater Greenville area. Furman began as Furman Academy and Theological Institution in 1825 named after Richard Furman. The theological school of Furman broke away in 1858 and became Southern Baptist Theological Seminary now in Louisville, Kentucky. North Greenville University was established in 1893 and is affiliated with the South Carolina Baptist Convention. Bob Jones University was established in 1927 by Bob Jones Sr. as a private non-denominational Protestant university. Greenville Technical College was established in 1962 as a technical college. The Evangelical Institute was founded in 1967 just north of the city at Paris Mountain.

Clemson University's Main campus is located 30 miles away, however, the university has several programs physically located in Downtown Greenville, as well as a specialty campus in Greenville called Clemson University International Center for Automotive Research that focuses on automotive research.

The University of South Carolina School of Medicine Greenville is a four-year medical school operating on a Prisma Health campus.

Supplementary schools
The Greenville Saturday School (GSS; グリーンビル日本語補習授業校 Gurīnbiru Nihongo Hoshū Jugyō Kō) is a weekend program for Japanese national students, with classes held at the French Bilingual School of South Carolina (EFB) in Wade Hampton. The Greenville school was scheduled to open in 1989, with Greenville Technical College the proposed classroom location. The school received $2,500 from the city council of Greenville.

Economy
Greenville's economy was formerly based largely on textile manufacturing, and the city was long known as "The Textile Capital of the World". In the last few decades, favorable wages and tax benefits have lured foreign companies to invest heavily in the area. The city is the North American headquarters for Michelin, Synnex, United Community Bank, AVX Corporation, NCEES, Ameco, Southern Tide, Confluence Outdoor, Concentrix, JTEKT, Cleva North America, Current Lighting Solutions, Greenville News, Prisma Health, and Scansource. In 2003, the International Center for Automotive Research was created, establishing CUICAR as the new model for automotive research. The Center for Emerging Technologies in mobility and energy was opened in 2011, hosting a number of companies in leading edge R&D and the headquarters for Sage Automotive.

When the former Donaldson Air Force Base closed, the land became the South Carolina Technology and Aviation Center, and became home to a Lockheed Martin aircraft and logistics center, as well as facilities operated by 3M and Honeywell. Donaldson Center Airport now occupies the former air base as a public airport. General Electric has a gas turbine, aviation and wind energy manufacturing operations located in Greenville.

Infrastructure

Health systems

Greenville has two main health systems, the Bon Secours Health and Prisma Health.

Bon Secours St. Francis Health System, which includes St. Francis Downtown; St. Francis Eastside; and St. Francis Outpatient Center and Upstate Surgery Center, is ranked among the best hospitals in the nation by HealthGrades for heart surgery and overall orthopedic services.

Prisma Health is a not-for-profit health organization that includes seven campuses in the Upstate area: Greenville Memorial Medical Center, North Greenville Long Term Acute Care Hospital and ER, Hillcrest Hospital, Patewood Memorial Hospital, Greer Memorial Hospital, Laurens County Memorial Hospital, and Oconee Memorial Hospital. It is one of the largest employers in the region. It was recognized for 2010–2011 as a top provider of cardiac and gastroenterology care by U.S. News & World Report. Prisma has the only children's hospital in the Upstate region of South Carolina. It hosts the University of South Carolina School of Medicine Greenville, a full four-year branch of the medical school in Columbia, South Carolina.

The Greenville Memorial Hospital was formerly operated by the municipal government, with Greenville Health System being the operating authority. In 2016, Prisma Health began leasing the hospital and directly operating it. The GHA is the portion of the Greenville Health System that still existed after the hospital transitioned into being operated by Prisma. The Greenville Health Authority (GHA) is the owner of the hospital facilities operated by Prisma. Members of the South Carolina Legislature select a majority of the seats of the board of directors of the GHA.

Greenville's Shriners Hospital for Children treats pediatric orthopedic patients exclusively, free of charge.

Transportation

Greenville is located on the Interstate 85 (I-85) corridor, approximately halfway between Atlanta and Charlotte. I-85 runs along the city's southeast edge and is connected to downtown Greenville by two spur routes: I-185, which also forms a southern beltway; and I-385, which continues southeast to a junction with I-26. Other major highways include U.S. Highway 123 (US 123), US 25, US 29 and US 276.

There are several airports servicing the Greenville area. The largest in the region, Greenville-Spartanburg International Airport (GSP), is the second busiest in the state and is served by most major airlines. SCTAC (formerly Donaldson Air Base) has undergone significant modernization and is the site of the new South Carolina Army National Guard Aviation Support Facility (AASF) and proposed Super General Aviation Center. Greenville serves as a freight hub for FedEx Express. The Greenville Downtown Airport, is the busiest general aviation airport in South Carolina with nearly 80,000 take-offs and landings annually and more than 198 based aircraft in 2022.

Public transit in Greenville is handled by the Greenville Transit Authority (GTA), which contracted out operations to the City Of Greenville in 2008 under a tri-party agreement with Greenville County. The city rebranded the service with the name Greenlink. Greenlink runs a bus system that serves the Greenville area, much of Greenville County including Mauldin and Simpsonville, and a portion of Pickens County via a connector to Clemson. In the 2010s, the city conducted studies for a personal rapid transit service that would serve downtown, University Ridge, and Clemson ICAR via an abandoned railroad right of way.

Greenville has an Amtrak station, which is part of Amtrak's Crescent, connecting Greenville with the cities of New York, Philadelphia, Baltimore, Washington, Raleigh, Charlotte, Atlanta, Birmingham and New Orleans. Additionally, Greenville is included in the Southeast High Speed Rail Corridor, which is proposed to run from Washington, D.C. to Jacksonville, Florida. Freight railroad service is provided by CSX Transportation, Norfolk Southern Railway, and the Carolina Piedmont Railroad. The former Greenville and Northern Railway line to Travelers Rest  has been abandoned and converted into a hiking and biking trail called the Swamp Rabbit Trail.

Sports teams

The National Christian College Athletic Association (NCCAA) sports conference is headquartered in Greenville, as are various minor league and university sports teams.

Minor League sports teams:
 Greenville Drive, a High-A affiliate of the Boston Red Sox in the High-A East. The Drive played their first season at Greenville Municipal Stadium, former home of the Atlanta Braves AA affiliate.  The Drive started their second season in their new downtown ballpark on April 6, 2006, which, prior to the start of the 2008 season, was renamed Fluor Field at the West End. For the first year after their founding, they were called the Greenville Bombers, having moved from Columbia, South Carolina. Before that, Greenville hosted various other minor league baseball teams, beginning with the Greenville Spinners in 1907.
 Greenville Swamp Rabbits, a minor league hockey team in the ECHL, began play in the 2010–11 hockey season as the Greenville Road Warriors and were renamed in 2015.
 Greenville Gaels, a hurling team in the Southeast Division of the US Gaelic Athletic Association.
 Greenville Triumph SC is a soccer team in USL League One.  In their first four seasons, the Triumph qualified for the league finals three times and won the league championship once (2020).  For the 2023 season, the team plays at Paladin Stadium on the campus of Furman University. 
 Greenville Liberty SC is a soccer team in USL W League.  In June 2021, the USL announced a women's team, associated with Greenville Triumph SC, would begin play in 2022 as part of a new W league.  In their inaugural season, the Liberty were the regular season champions of the South Atlantic Division.  For the 2023 season, the team plays at Paladin Stadium on the campus of Furman University.
 Greenville FC was a soccer team in the NPSL that began in 2018; they play at Sirrine Stadium though went on hiatus for the 2020 season.
 Carolina Upstate Thunder of the Women's American Basketball Association plays home games at Legacy Early College beginning in July 2021.

Furman University
 The Furman Paladins compete at the NCAA Division I level. (Note: Furman football is a member of the NCAA Football Championship Subdivision.)  Furman athletic teams compete on-campus in various venues, including Paladin Stadium, Timmons Arena, and the Eugene Stone Soccer Stadium. Furman is a member of the Southern Conference.
Bob Jones University
 Bob Jones University competes at the NCCAA Division II level. The BJU Bruins began intercollegiate athletics in the 2012–2013 school year. The school began with men and women's soccer and basketball, with hopes of eventually adding other sports.  Cross country and golf were added for the 2013–2014 school year. Men's and women's shooting sports were added in 2016.

North Greenville University

 North Greenville University competes at the NCAA Division II level.

Culture
Greenville has been named one of the "Top 100 Arts Small Towns in the United States." The Bon Secours Wellness Arena brings national tours of many popular bands to downtown, and the Peace Center for the Performing Arts provides a venue for orchestras and plays. A planned multimillion-dollar renovation to the center's main concert hall lobby and riverside amphitheatre began in the spring of 2011.

Visual art

A number of local artists operate studios and galleries in the city, especially the Village of West Greenville near downtown. The Metropolitan Arts Council provides a number of public events that focus on the visual arts, including the First Fridays Gallery Crawl and Greenville Open Studios. Greenville also provides some notable fine arts museums:

The Greenville County Museum of Art, home of the Andrew Wyeth Collection, was founded with a significant contribution from local industrialist, Arthur Magill. It contains pieces by Jackson Pollock, Jonathan Greene, Georgia O'Keeffe, Jasper Johns and William H. Johnson.
The Bob Jones University Museum and Gallery contains a diverse collection of European masterworks

Music
Greenville's music scene is home to local, regional, and national bands performing music in the various genres. The city is home to the Greenville Symphony Orchestra, Greenville County Youth Orchestra, Carolina Youth Symphony, the Carolina Pops Orchestra, and the Greenville Concert Band. The Boston Symphony Orchestra regularly performs at the Bon Secours Wellness Arena. Greenville Light Opera Works (GLOW Lyric Theatre) is a professional lyric theatre in Greenville that produces Musical Theatre, Operetta and Opera.

Local a cappella singing groups include the women's Vocal Matrix Chorus (formerly Greenville in Harmony) and the men's Palmetto Statesmen chorus. Additional choral groups include the Greenville Chorale and the Greenville Gay Men's Chorus.

Many notable active national touring acts have Greenville roots, including:

 Nile
 The Marcus King Band
 Edwin McCain
 Islander
 Nikki Lane
 Austin Webb
 Peabo Bryson

Historically, Greenville has been the home of various nationally renown musicians, including:
 Ann Sexton
 Cat Anderson
 Josh White
 Mac Arnold

Lynyrd Skynyrd played their last concert with all original members in Greenville, on October 19, 1977; a portion of the band, and band staff, were killed in a plane crash upon leaving Greenville's Downtown Airport.

Comedy
There are eight comedy venues in Greenville featuring stand-up comedy, sketch comedy, ventriloquists, as well as experimental and non-traditional comedy.

Dance and theater

The Carolina Ballet Theatre is a professional dance company that regularly presents programs at the Peace Center and elsewhere. CBT presents four performances annually as the resident professional dance company of the Peace Center with their largest as the holiday classic, "The Nutcracker, Once Upon A Time in Greenville."  This production is modelled after the major companies that have set their holiday class in their hometown. Centre Stage, Greenville Theatre, South Carolina Children's Theater and the Warehouse Theatre are the major playhouses in the area. These theaters offer a variety of performances including well-known works, such as Death of a Salesman and Grease, and plays written by local playwrights. During the Spring and Summer, the local Shakespearean company performs Shakespeare in the Park at the Falls Park Amphitheater.

Literary arts 
Two literary non-profit groups are located in Greenville: The Emrys Foundation, founded in 1983, and Wits End Poetry, founded in 2002.

Media

 The Greenville News is the city's daily newspaper and also the Upstate's largest daily newspaper in circulation and readership.
 Greenville Journal: Weekly newspaper dealing with business, economic development, local events, and current issues relevant to Greenville.  It was originally the Greenville Civic and Commercial Journal
 The Post and Courier: daily newspaper based in Charleston, has a Greenville edition, Post and Courier Greenville, which features "Greenville news reported, written and edited by Greenville journalists for readers in the Upstate."
 GVLtoday: Hyper-local news site operated by Greenville-based media company 6 AM City. 
 Upstate Business Journal: Weekly business newspaper reaching 100,000 business leaders in Greenville, Spartanburg, and Anderson counties.
 GSA Business: Published every two weeks, it covers business news from across the Greenville-Spartanburg-Anderson metro area.
 Greenville Business Magazine: Monthly magazine that contains business information for and about the Greenville area.
 Upstate Link magazine: The weekly publication began in January 2004 as part of The Greenville News and remained in print until 2008. It is now defunct.
 ShareGVL (Share Greenville): similar to Humans of New York, it is a nonprofit digital community that humanizes residents of Greenville.

Radio
Greenville is part of the Greenville-Spartanburg-Anderson Arbitron Metro which is the nation's 59th largest radio market with a person 12+ population of 813,700. See the box below for the local radio stations:

Television
Greenville is part of the Greenville-Spartanburg-Anderson-Asheville DMA, which is the nation's 36th largest television market. See the box below for the local television stations:

Demographics

Greenville is the largest principal city of the Greenville-Anderson-Mauldin Metropolitan Statistical Area, a metropolitan area that covers Greenville, Laurens, Anderson and Pickens counties and had a combined population of 874,869 as of 2015.

Since South Carolina law makes annexing the suburban areas around cities difficult, Greenville's city proper population is small as a proportion of the total population of the urbanized area.

2020 census

As of the 2020 United States census, there were 70,720 people, 32,250 households, and 15,431 families residing in the city.

2010 census
As of the census of 2010, there were 58,409 people, 24,382 households, and 12,581 families residing in the city. The racial composition of the city was 62.12% White, 31.54% Black or African American, 3.44% Hispanic or Latino (of any race), 1.27% Asian, 0.14% Native American, 0.06% Pacific Islander, 1.37% of other races, and 1.11% of Two or more races.

There were 29,418 households, out of which 22.3% had children under the age of 18 living with them, 32.7% were married couples living together, 15.5% had a female householder with no husband present, and 48.4% were non-families. 40.8% of all households were made up of individuals, and 12.8% had someone living alone who was 65 years of age or older. The average household size was 2.11 and the average family size was 2.90.

In the city, the age distribution of the population shows 20.0% under the age of 18, 13.8% from 18 to 24, 31.3% from 25 to 44, 20.5% from 45 to 64, and 14.4% who were 65 years of age or older. The median age was 35 years. For every 100 females, there were 89.9 males. For every 100 females age 18 and over, there were 86.8 males.

The median income for a household in the city was $33,144, and the median income for a family was $44,125. Males had a median income of $35,111 versus $25,339 for females. The per capita income for the city was $23,242. About 12.2% of families and 16.1% of the population were below the poverty line, including 22.7% of those under age 18 and 17.5% of those age 65 or over.

Notable people

Sister cities
Greenville is twinned with:
 Bergamo, Italy since 1984
 Kortrijk, Belgium since 1991
 Tianjin Free-Trade Zone, China since 2002
 Vadodara, India

See also 
 List of municipalities in South Carolina

Notes

References

External links

 
 
 Greater Greenville Chamber of Commerce

 
Cities in South Carolina
Cities in Greenville County, South Carolina
Populated places established in 1797
County seats in South Carolina
Upstate South Carolina
1797 establishments in the United States